Otunje is a village in the municipality of Tetovo, North Macedonia.

Demographics
According to the 2021 census, the village had a total of 3 inhabitants. Ethnic groups in the village include:

Macedonians 2
Serbs 1

References

Villages in Tetovo Municipality